Brigg Fair is a traditional English folk song sung by the Lincolnshire singer Joseph Taylor. The song, which is named after a historical fair in Brigg, Lincolnshire, was collected and recorded on wax cylinder by the composer and folk song collector Percy Grainger. It is known for its use in classical music, both in a choral arrangement by Grainger and a subsequent set of orchestral variations by Frederick Delius.

The original song 

The song, which is listed as Roud 1083, has only been collected from members of Joseph Taylor's family, as well as a Mr. Deene of Brigg. Joseph Taylor learnt "Brigg Fair" from gypsies camped near Brigg sometime around the year 1850. Initially, he spied on them from afar as they sat around their campfire singing, but the King of the Gypsies invited him in and taught him the song.

In 1907, Percy Grainger recorded Joseph Taylor singing "Brigg Fair" shortly after a music festival in Brigg, North Lincolnshire. The recording survives and is commercially available; it was digitised by the British Library and made available online in 2018.

Joseph Taylor only knew two verses of what can be assumed to be a longer song.It was on the fifth of August,

The weather hot and fair,

Unto Brigg Fair I did repair,

For love I was inclined.

I got up with the lark in the morning

With my heart so full of glee,

Expecting there to meet my dear,

Long time I wished to see.

The fair 
Brigg Fair is an annual event held in the English market town of Brigg, North Lincolnshire, on every 5 August since 1205.  It was primarily an event at which horses were bought and sold. While it is still held today, it is now celebrated primarily for historic and traditional reasons, and mostly organised by the travelling community.

Grainger's choral setting

Grainger soon made an arrangement of the song for unaccompanied five-part chorus with a tenor soloist. The original song was short, since Taylor could remember only two stanzas, and Grainger added three stanzas taken from two other songs, "Low Down in the Broom" and "The Merry King". The tune, in the Dorian mode, is wistful, and the lyric is a happy one about true love.

The song has appeared in several different versions, including one set down by Taylor and members of his family. These are the words set by Grainger:

The last three verses were collected by Grainger from two different songs found in different locations. Grainger added the extra verses to "complete" Taylor's original first two verses. Descendants of Taylor, including his daughter Mary, falsely believed that Taylor sang all five verses.

Delius's orchestral setting
Delius heard Grainger's setting, and was impressed by both the tune and the arrangement. With Grainger's permission, he used the song as the basis of an orchestral work, first performed in 1908. After a pastoral introduction Grainger's setting is replicated by the woodwinds. A succession of variations on the original tune leads to a joyous finale. 

Joseph Taylor was a guest at the first performance. While there is a popular story that he stood up and sang along, this legend was denied by Taylor's grand-daughter, Marion Hudson.

Instrumentation 
3 flutes, 2 oboes, cor anglais, 3 clarinets, bass clarinet, 3 bassoons, contrabassoon, 6 horns, 3 trumpets, 3 trombones, tuba, timpani, percussion (bass drum, triangle, tubular bells), harp, strings

References

External links 
 
 

Compositions by Frederick Delius
Compositions by Percy Grainger
English folk songs
1908 compositions
Compositions for symphony orchestra
Variations